Ross Campbell is a Scottish composer and songwriter. He is possibly best known for his score for the short film Poor Angels which earned him a Best Composer nomination at the 1996 BAFTA Scotland Awards.

Life and career
Ross Campbell studied composition as the prestigious Royal College of Music in London and further enhanced his studies at the Royal Scottish Academy of Music and Drama (now Royal Conservatoire of Scotland) in Glasgow. Upon leaving university, Ross pursued a career in commercial music and worked with many bands including Nightcrawlers in which he co-wrote the song "Push the Feeling On" which enjoyed success on both sides of the Atlantic selling over 750,000 copies in the United States alone. In the mid-1990s, Campbell began working as a composer for film and television. In 1996, he composed the music for the short film Poor Angels which starred Peter Mullan in the lead role. The score earned Campbell a nomination at the 1996 BAFTA Scotland Awards. On the small screen, Campbell provided music for shows such as Missing and the long running crime series Taggart.

In 2017, under the moniker Mondorosco, he released the album Kompass Strasse. His writing credits include hit records for artists such as Riton, French Montana, AJ Tracey and Big Narstie. 

Ross is the founder and MD of the record label Fool the Public. He is also a lecturer at Glasgow Kelvin College.

Filmography

Film

Television

Discography

Awards and nominations

References

External links

Ross Campbell Music website

Living people
Scottish composers
Alumni of the Royal Conservatoire of Scotland
Alumni of the Royal College of Music
British composers
Year of birth missing (living people)
Musicians from Glasgow